José Manuel Romero Urtasun (born 25 February 1977), known as Josetxo, is a Spanish former footballer who played as a central defender.

He played the vast majority of his professional career with Osasuna, appearing in 212 La Liga games over the course of ten seasons.

Club career

Osasuna
Josetxo was born in Pamplona, Navarre. Other than a second division season-long loan at SD Eibar in 1999–2000, he played the first 15 years of his career with hometown's CA Osasuna, making his La Liga debut on 1 December 2001 in a 1–2 away defeat against Real Madrid; he had previously appeared with the club in the second level, as it returned to the top flight precisely as he was serving his loan.

In the 2000–01 campaign, after returning to his alma mater, Josetxo played the last of his three seasons with the reserve side in division three. He contributed with 36 games for a final eighth place, scoring three goals.

Josetxo appeared in 29 matches as Osasuna finished fourth in 2005–06, achieving UEFA Champions League third qualifying round honours. In the subsequent run in the UEFA Cup, he played in nine contests to help his team reach the last four; in December 2006 he signed a three-year contract extension, going on to be regularly used in the following four years (he was also sent off four times combined), always spent in the top tier.

Later years
On 5 July 2011, 34-year-old Josetxo left Osasuna and signed a one-year deal with SD Huesca, in the second division. He retired at the end of the season.

References

External links

1977 births
Living people
Footballers from Pamplona
Spanish footballers
Association football defenders
La Liga players
Segunda División players
Segunda División B players
CA Osasuna B players
CA Osasuna players
SD Eibar footballers
SD Huesca footballers
Spain youth international footballers